Geoffrey Gordon Allen (b 1939) was Archdeacon of North West Europe from 1993 to 2004.

Allen was educated at  Salisbury and Wells Theological College. He was ordained deacon in 1966 and priest in 1967.  After a curacy at St Mary the Virgin, Langley Marish he was with the Mission to Seamen until 1970. He then served at Rotterdam, Voorschoten, The Hague, Arnhem, Nijmegen, Twenthe  and Haarlem.

References

1939 births
Alumni of Salisbury Theological College
Archdeacons of North West Europe
Living people
21st-century English Anglican priests
20th-century English Anglican priests